The ThinkPad G series is a series of desktop replacement ThinkPad laptops made by IBM. It consisted of the G40, G41 and G50.

G40 and G41 

The G40 and G41 was based on an Intel Pentium 4 and was released as low-end, affordable and massive successors of Pentium 4-M-equipped 15" ThinkPad A31 and 14" ThinkPad T30. 

Both models has a 2 screen size options: the 15" and 14.1" screens with same case.

G50 
The G50 has only been sold in Japan.

G50 has only 15" screen option.

References

External links 
 Hardware maintenance manual of the G40 and G41 on the Wayback Machine
 German Thinkwiki - G40
 German Thinkwiki - G41
 German Thinkwiki - G50

IBM laptops
ThinkPad